Organization of Iranian People's Fedai Guerrillas (Minority) was an Iranian Marxist–Leninist organisation. An offshoot of the Organization of Iranian People's Fedai Guerrillas, it split from the majority faction, adhering to its original militant policy of opposing the Tudeh Party and challenging the Islamic Republic.

In January 1982, it was joined by the Organization of Iranian People's Fedaian-Majority Left Wing led by Moṣṭafā Madani, an offshoot of Organization of Iranian People's Fedaian (Majority) that broke away from the latter in October 1980.

The group was engaged in guerrilla warfare in the forests of northern Iran and Kurdistan Province. Its policy was against the Soviet Union and considered the Soviet Union of post-Stalin era as a revisionist state.

See also

References

Political parties of the Iranian Revolution
Defunct communist parties in Iran
Militant opposition to the Islamic Republic of Iran
Banned communist parties
Banned political parties in Iran
1980 establishments in Iran
Political parties established in 1980
Political parties disestablished in 1987
Left-wing militant groups in Iran